Phillips County is a county in the U.S. state of Montana. As of the 2020 census, the population was 4,217. Its county seat is Malta. Before February 5, 1915, Phillips County was part of Blaine County, and before 1912 both were part of Chouteau County. It was named for rancher and state senator Benjamin D. Phillips.

Its northern boundary is the Canada–United States border with Saskatchewan. The Missouri River defines its southern boundary.

Geography
It is the second-largest county in Montana by land area and third-largest by total area.

Adjacent counties and rural municipalities

 Blaine County - west
 Fergus County - southwest
 Petroleum County - south
 Garfield County - southeast
 Valley County - east
 Rural Municipality (RM) of Lone Tree No. 18, Saskatchewan (SK) - north
 RM of Val Marie No. 17, SK - north
 RM of Mankota No. 45, SK - northeast

National protected areas

 Bowdoin National Wildlife Refuge
 Charles M. Russell National Wildlife Refuge (part)
 Hewitt Lake National Wildlife Refuge
 UL Bend National Wildlife Refuge
 Upper Missouri River Breaks National Monument (part)

Demographics

2000 census
As of the 2000 United States census, there were 4,601 people, 1,848 households, and 1,241 families in the county. The population density was <1/km2 (<1/sq mi). There were 2,502 housing units at an average density of <1/km2 (<1/sq mi). The racial makeup of the county was 89.44% White, 0.15% Black or African American, 7.61% Native American, 0.33% Asian, 0.02% Pacific Islander, 0.37% from other races, and 2.09% from two or more races. 1.15% of the population were Hispanic or Latino of any race. 25.3% were of German, 19.0% Norwegian, 7.6% Irish and 6.5% English ancestry. 97.0% spoke English and 2.5% German as their first language.

There were 1,848 households, out of which 31.90% had children under the age of 18 living with them, 57.20% were married couples living together, 6.80% had a female householder with no husband present, and 32.80% were non-families. 29.10% of all households were made up of individuals, and 14.60% had someone living alone who was 65 years of age or older. The average household size was 2.45 and the average family size was 3.03.

The county population contained 27.30% under the age of 18, 5.50% from 18 to 24, 24.50% from 25 to 44, 25.10% from 45 to 64, and 17.60% who were 65 years of age or older. The median age was 41 years. For every 100 females there were 100.40 males. For every 100 women age 18 and over, there were 95.60 men.

The median income for a household in the county was $28,702, and the median income for a family was $37,529. Males had a median income of $25,132 versus $20,274 for females. The per capita income for the county was $15,058. About 13.80% of families and 18.30% of the population were below the poverty line, including 23.10% of those under age 18 and 12.10% of those age 65 or over.

2010 census
As of the 2010 United States census, there were 4,253 people, 1,819 households, and 1,159 families residing in the county. The racial makeup of the county was 87.0% white, 8.3% American Indian, 0.2% Asian, 0.4% from other races, and 4.0% from two or more races. Those of Hispanic or Latino origin made up 1.9% of the population. In terms of ancestry, 26.2% were Norwegian, 24.3% were German, 13.4% were Irish, 10.1% were American, and 9.0% were English.

Of the 1,819 households, 27.6% had children under the age of 18 living with them, 52.9% were married couples living together, 7.4% had a female householder with no husband present, 36.3% were non-families, and 32.2% of all households were made up of individuals. The average household size was 2.27 and the average family size was 2.86. The median age was 46.8 years.

The median income for a household in the county was $36,453 and the median income for a family was $55,362. Males had a median income of $41,826 versus $26,417 for females. The per capita income for the county was $24,227. About 11.4% of families and 13.5% of the population were below the poverty line, including 17.1% of those under age 18 and 4.8% of those age 65 or over.

Politics
From its creation until 1964, voters of Phillips County were fairly balanced; they selected Democratic Party candidates in 58% of national elections. After 1964 the Republican presidential candidate has garnered the county's vote in every election.

Communities

City
 Malta (county seat)

Towns
 Dodson
 Saco

Census-designated places
 East Malta Colony
 Landusky
 Loring Colony
 Sleeping Buffalo
 Whitewater
 Zortman

Other unincorporated communities

 Bowdoin
 Caldwell
 Cole
 Content
 Cree Crossing
 Jordan Crossing
 Loring
 Morgan
 Tattnall
 Wagner

See also

 List of lakes in Phillips County, Montana
 List of mountains in Phillips County, Montana
 National Register of Historic Places listings in Phillips County MT

References

External links
 Phillips County Sheriff's Office

Further reading

 

 
Montana counties on the Missouri River
1915 establishments in Montana
Populated places established in 1915